Yin Fu (Chanhuaicun, Jixian, China, 1840 – China, June, 1909) was a Baguazhang (a martial art) disciple of Dong Haichuan  responsible for the creation of the Yin Style Baguazhang.

Yin Fu was Dong's earliest disciple in Prince Duan's palace. Yin's kungfu skills advanced very fast during the next several years and Duan let Yin join the king's security guards.

When Master Dong retired, Yin took over as the supervisor of the security guards, working for the emperor in the Forbidden City. The Empress Dowager liked his skill and even wanted to study with him.

Yin taught Bagua and lived on the eastern side of Beijing city; as a result, the Yin style of kungfu is called Dong-cheng Zhang (Eastern City Palm). The other name for the Yin style is Niu-she Zhang (Ox Tongue Palm) because the palm's shape in this style looks like an ox tongue. Yin style Bagua Zhang includes eight sections, each with eight postures. The sixty-four posture palm change is practiced in circle walking.

Later some of Yin's students changed their style. They did eight palm changes as a major practice. This approach is similar to Cheng style.

References

External links
 Interview with Mr. Xie Peiqi, Yin style Baguazhang expert from Beijing, by Jarek Szymanski
 Introduction of Yin Style Bagua Zhang
 Eight Animal Postures of Yin Style Bagua
 London Group of Yin Style Baguazhang, Xie Peiqi/He Jinbao lineage

1840 births
1909 deaths
Chinese baguazhang practitioners
Sportspeople from Hebei
People from Hengshui